Mudeungsan National Park, previously Mudeungsan Provincial Park, is located in the city of Gwangju and the province of Jeollanam-do, South Korea. The park was designated a provincial park on 22 May 1972 and was upgraded to national park status in 2012, making it South Korea's 21st national park.

See also
 List of national parks of South Korea

References

External links
 Official park website 
 Korea National Park Service's website

National parks of South Korea
Protected areas established in 2012
Geography of Gwangju
Parks in South Jeolla Province